Strays is the debut album by the Canadian rock band Junkhouse. It is the band's best-selling album, being certified Gold in Canada for selling 50,000 copies.

This album was also released in Japan.

Track listing 
 "Jesus Sings the Blues" (Tom Wilson, Junkhouse) – 5:46
 "Out of My Head" (Wilson, Memphis) – 3:45
 "Weight on Me Mama" (Wilson, Memphis) – 3:57
 "The Sky Is Falling" (Wilson, Douglas) – 3:06
 "Gimme the Love" (Junkhouse) – 3:15
 "Stone Horses" (Wilson, Junkhouse) – 4:15
 "Praying for the Rain" (Wilson, Junkhouse) – 3:04
 "Big Lake" (Wilson, Junkhouse, Malcolm Burn) – 5:20
 "This Old Man's Too Drunk to Drive" (Wilson) – 2:41
 "No Way Out of Love (The Rounder)" (Wilson, Memphis) – 4:11
 "Big Brown Turtle" (Wilson, Junkhouse) – 4:02
 "This Kitchen Feels Like Home" (Wilson, Tim Gibbons) – 3:57
 "The Buffalo Skinner" (Wilson) – 4:20
 "The Waiting" (Wilson) – 4:47

Personnel
 Dan Achen – electric guitar, feedback, vocals
 Ray Farrugia – drums, drums, drums, vocals, percussion
 Russ Wilson – Big Bottom End, vocals
 Tom Wilson – acoustic guitar, woops, wallops, vocals

Additional musicians
 Malcolm Burn – Dulcimer, vocals, keyboards, percussion, impressions
 Lisa Germano – violin, vocals
 Mike Roth – acoustic guitar, percussion
 Tim Gibbons – vocals, percussion

References

1993 debut albums
Albums produced by Malcolm Burn